"Don't Waste Your Time" is a 1984 single by Yarbrough & Peoples.  The song was written and produced by Jonah Ellis and was the duo's second number one on the R&B chart and also charted on the Hot 100 peaking at number forty-eight.

References

1984 songs
1984 singles